The 1987 Men's EuroHockey Nations Championship was the fifth edition of the Men's EuroHockey Nations Championship, the quadrennial international men's field hockey championship of Europe organized by the European Hockey Federation. It was held in Moscow, Soviet Union from 20 to 30 August 1987.

The defending champions the Netherlands won their second title by defeating England 3–0 in penalty strokes after the match finished 1–1 after extra time. West Germany won the bronze medal by defeating the hosts the Soviet Union 3–2 after extra time.

Preliminary round

Pool A

Pool B

Classification round

Ninth to twelfth place classification

9–12th place semi-finals

Eleventh place game

Ninth place game

Fifth to eighth place classification

5–8th place semi-finals

Seventh place game

Fifth place game

First to fourth place classification

Semi-finals

Third place game

Final

Final standings

See also
1987 Women's EuroHockey Nations Championship

References

Men's EuroHockey Nations Championship
EuroHockey Nations Championship
EuroHockey Nations Championship
International field hockey competitions hosted by the Soviet Union
Sports competitions in Moscow
EuroHockey Nations Championship
EuroHockey Nations Championship